Lee Sung-Hye (Hangul: 이성혜, born October 21, 1984 in Seoul) is a South Korean taekwondo practitioner. She is the first female South Korean taekwondo athlete to win two gold medals at the Asian Games.

External links
 
 Guangzhou 2010 profile

1984 births
Living people
South Korean female taekwondo practitioners
Asian Games medalists in taekwondo
Taekwondo practitioners at the 2006 Asian Games
Taekwondo practitioners at the 2010 Asian Games
Asian Games gold medalists for South Korea
Medalists at the 2006 Asian Games
Medalists at the 2010 Asian Games
Universiade medalists in taekwondo
Universiade gold medalists for South Korea
World Taekwondo Championships medalists
Medalists at the 2005 Summer Universiade
21st-century South Korean women